Donald Alastair Cameron OBE (17 March 1900 – 5 January 1974) was an Australian politician. He was a member of the Liberal Party and served in federal parliament from 1946 to 1961, representing the Division of Oxley in Queensland. He was a doctor by profession and held ministerial office as Minister for Health in the Menzies Government from 1956 to 1961. After losing his seat he served a term as High Commissioner to New Zealand (1962–1965).

Early life
Cameron was born in Ipswich, Queensland. He received his education from Ipswich Grammar School and Sydney University, where he graduated in arts and medicine. From 1927 to 1933 he served as a medical officer at the Royal Prince Alfred Hospital and the Coast Hospital in Sydney.  In 1933, he married Rhoda Florence McLean and they then settled at Ipswich, where he practised until the Second World War, in which he served as a colonel in the Australian Army Medical Corps in the Mediterranean and Middle East Theatre and New Guinea.  He was mentioned in dispatches and made an Officer of the Order of the British Empire (OBE) in 1946.

Politics
After the war Cameron joined the newly formed Liberal Party of Australia, and at the 1949 election he was elected to the Australian House of Representatives for the new seat of Oxley, based on Ipswich. He was Minister for Health in the Menzies government from 1956 to 1961.  He was also appointed Minister in charge of the Commonwealth Scientific and Industrial Research Organisation in 1960 following Richard Casey's retirement.  At the 1961 election he was unexpectedly defeated by the young Australian Labor Party candidate, Bill Hayden.

Later life
After his defeat, Cameron worked as Commonwealth medical officer in Sydney and was Australia's High Commissioner to New Zealand from 1962 to 1965.  He was then a general practitioner in the Brisbane suburb of Nundah.

Death
He died in the Brisbane suburb of Chermside, survived by his wife, daughter and son.

References

Liberal Party of Australia members of the Parliament of Australia
1900 births
1974 deaths
Members of the Australian House of Representatives for Oxley
Members of the Australian House of Representatives
Australian Officers of the Order of the British Empire
High Commissioners of Australia to New Zealand
20th-century Australian politicians
Australian general practitioners
Australian Army personnel of World War II
People from Ipswich, Queensland
University of Sydney alumni
Australian military doctors
Australian Army officers
Australian Ministers for Health